Cryptandra craigiae is a flowering plant in the family Rhamnaceae and is endemic to a restricted area of southern Western Australia. It is a shrub with linear leaves and dense clusters of white or cream-coloured, tube-shaped flowers.

Description
The upper surface of the leaves is more or less glabrous and the edges are turned down or rolled under, often concealing the densely hairy lower surface. The flowers are borne in dense clusters of 4 to 6,  in diameter, on the ends of branchlets. Flowering occurs from May to June.

Taxonomy and naming
Cryptandra craigiae was first formally described in 2007 by Barbara Lynette Rye in the journal Nuytsia from specimens collected by Gillian Craig north-north-east of Hopetoun in 2005. The specific epithet (craigiae ) honours the collector of the type specimens.

Distribution and habitat
This cryptandra mainly grows on sand dunes in or near swampy areas, but is only known from a small area near Hopetoun in the Esperance Plains bioregion of southern Western Australia.

Conservation status
This cryptandra is listed as "Threatened" by the Western Australian Government Department of Biodiversity, Conservation and Attractions, meaning that it is in danger of extinction.

References

craigiae
Rosales of Australia
Flora of Western Australia
Plants described in 2007
Taxa named by Barbara Lynette Rye